Siegel (also Segal or Segel), is a German and Ashkenazi Jewish surname. it can be traced to 11th century Bavaria and was used by people who made wax seals for or sealed official documents (each such male being described as a Siegelbeamter). Alternate spellings include Sigel, Sigl, Siegl, and others. "Siegel" is also the modern German word for seal. The name ultimately derives from the Latin sigillum,  meaning "seal" as in the Seal of the City of New York: Sigillum Civitatis Novi Eboraci. The Germanicized derivative of the name was given to professional seal makers and engravers. Some researchers have attributed the surname to Sigel, referring to Sól (Sun), the goddess of the sun in Germanic mythology (Siȝel or sigel in Old English / Anglo-Saxon), but that is highly speculative.

Variants, and false cognates 
Other variants may routinely include Siegelman, Siegle, Sigl, and Sigel. Presumably, some bearers of these names are lineal descendants of ethnic Jews who changed the spellings of their surnames in the course of assimilating among other cultures: "Segal" and "Segel"  are false cognates to Siegel, usually having derived from Latin America, where the double vowel did not translate into pronunciation.

Most sources indicate that it derives from the Hebrew acronym 	
סגל the abbreviated form of either Sagan Gadol ha-Leviya, which means "great assistant to the Levites", or Sagan Gadol L'-Cohen which means "great assistant to the Cohanim" (special group of Levites who tended to more holy tasks within the Jewish Temple), and was an honorific title bestowed upon a member of the tribe of Levi who performed temple duties faithfully. (Some Rabbis aver that Segal/Segall derives from the Hebrew s'gula, meaning "treasure."  However, this would not explain the association of the name only with the tribe of Levi.) Further, the double-L in Segall seems to be a specifically Romanian spelling variant.

Siegel

 Adam Siegel (born 1969), American guitarist
 Bernard Siegel (1868–1940), Austro-Hungarian born American character actor
 Bernard Siegel, American attorney
 Bernie S. Siegel (born 1932), American writer and retired pediatric surgeon
 Bugsy Siegel (1906–1947), American mobster
 Carl Ludwig Siegel (1896–1981), German mathematician 
Corky Siegel (born 1943), American harmonica player in the Siegel–Schwall Band 
 David Siegel (disambiguation), several people
 Don Siegel, American film and television director and producer
 Dora Siegel (1912-2003), birth name of Dora Gad, Israeli interior designer
 Eli Siegel (1902–1978), Latvian-American poet and critic who founded philosophy of aesthetic realism
 George L. Siegel (1885-1963), American lawyer and politician
 James Siegel (born 1954), American thriller novelist
 Jeremy Siegel (born 1945), American Professor of Finance at the Wharton School of the University of Pennsylvania, author and commentator
 Jerry Siegel (1914–1996), American, one of the creators of Superman
 Joel Siegel (1943–2007), American film critic and television journalist
 Karola Siegel, birthname of Ruth Westheimer (born 1928; known as "Dr. Ruth"), German-American sex therapist, talk show host, author, professor, Holocaust survivor, and former Haganah sniper.
 Kate Siegel (born 1982), American actress and screenwriter
 Larry Siegel (1925-2019), American comedy writer
 Mark Siegel (born 1967), American graphic novel author and publisher
 Max Siegel, American corporate CEO
 Mona L. Siegel, American scholar, author, and historian
 Ralph Siegel (born 1945), German record producer and songwriter
 Ralph Siegel (scientist) (1958–2011), American neuroscientist
 Rick Siegel, American comedian, talent agent and inventor
 Robert Siegel, American radio journalist, host of NPR's  All Things Considered
 Shepard Siegel, Canadian psychologist
 Sol C. Siegel (1903–1982), American reporter and film producer
 Stephen Siegel (born 1944), American real estate executive, chairman of CB Richard Ellis
 Steven Siegel (born 1953), American sculptor
 Warren Siegel,  American physicist
 Wayne Siegel (born 1953), American composer living in Århus, Denmark
 William Siegel (1905–1990), American graphic artist

Seigel
Andrea Seigel (born 1979), American novelist and screenwriter
Jerrold Seigel, American historian
Kalman Seigel (1917–1998), an American journalist

Siegal
 Ian Siegal (born 1971), British blues singer and guitarist
 Justine Siegal (born 1975), American baseball coach and sports educator

Seigal
Anna Seigal, British mathematician
Bernard Seigal (1957–2006), American musician

Sigl
Georg Sigl (1811–1887), Austrian mechanical engineer and entrepreneur
Robert Sigl (born 1962), German filmmaker
Rudi Sigl (born 1937), German sport shooter
Wolfgang Sigl (born 1972), Austrian rower

Mathematical concepts
Brauer–Siegel theorem
Gelfand–Naimark–Segal construction
Siegel modular form
Segal space
Newell–Whitehead–Segel equation
Siegel zero

See also
Chagall (disambiguation)
Segal
Segel
Sigel (disambiguation)

External links 
 Origins of the name from segal.org 
 Frequency of the name Siegel from segal.org 

Jewish surnames
Levite surnames
Germanic-language surnames
German-language surnames
Yiddish-language surnames